The MTV Europe Music Award for Best Electronic was originally entitled Best Dance and was first awarded in 1994 until 2003. It was one of the original two genre categories that were added to the MTV Europe Music Awards that year. The big winner on this category were The Prodigy with four awards. The category was revived in 2012, in which it was renamed to its current title.

Winners and nominees
Winners are listed first and highlighted in bold.

† indicates an MTV Video Music Award for Best Dance Video–winning artist.
‡ indicates an MTV Video Music Award for Best Dance Video–nominated artist that same year.

1990s

2000s

2010s

2020s

See also
 MTV Video Music Award for Best Dance Video

References

MTV Europe Music Awards
Awards established in 1994
Dance music awards